Jeffrey Garlin (born June 5, 1962) is an American stand-up comedian and actor. He is best known for playing Murray Goldberg, patriarch of the eponymous family in the ABC sitcom The Goldbergs, and Jeff Greene on the HBO sitcom Curb Your Enthusiasm. He also played Marvin on Mad About You and Mort Meyers on Arrested Development for Fox and Netflix.

He has also appeared in ParaNorman, WALL-E, Toy Story 3, and Safety Not Guaranteed, among other films.

Early life
Garlin was born in Chicago, Illinois, to Gene and Carole (née Crafton) Garlin. He grew up in Morton Grove, Illinois, where his father owned a plumbing supply business called Bilko and his mother was active in community theater. He has a younger brother, Michael. Garlin is Jewish and attended Hebrew school.

Garlin says he has wanted to be a comedian since the age of eight, when he saw Jimmy Durante perform in Chicago. Garlin attended Melzer Elementary School in Morton Grove, Illinois. He enjoyed playing sports at school, but had to stop after being diagnosed with  Wolff–Parkinson–White syndrome, a heart ailment.

When Garlin was in sixth grade, his father sold his supply business and the family relocated to South Florida. He graduated from Nova High School in Davie, Florida, in 1980. He attended Broward Community College, followed by an aborted stint studying film at the University of Miami, where he first began to perform stand-up comedy.

Career

Standup
In 1984, aged 22, Garlin moved back to Chicago to pursue a stand-up comedy career. He performed with the comedy troupe The Second City. He worked in the box office with Stephen Colbert.

While living in Wrigleyville, Chicago during the 1980s, Garlin was briefly roommates with Conan O'Brien, who was then a comedy writer. He remains close to O'Brien, and after O'Brien was removed as host of The Tonight Show in 2010 so that Jay Leno could return, Garlin stated that he would not be a guest on the show again.

Garlin was hired by comedians Denis Leary and Jon Stewart to help develop their specials. He worked as a stage director for their shows and edited the scripts. He worked with Larry David in this same way. He continues to do standup, where he says he improvises a lot on stage, and feels very relaxed, "maybe too relaxed."

Misconduct allegations
On December 3, 2021, Vanity Fair published an article detailing that Garlin had been under investigation for three years for "allegedly engag[ing] in a pattern of verbal and physical conduct on [the set of The Goldbergs]  that made people uncomfortable." The report found that he had used "inappropriate language", and engaged in "unwanted physical contact" on set such as hugging or touching others without their consent. On December 15, 2021, it was announced that Garlin will not return to the show. His departure was announced as a mutual decision.

Film and television
Garlin has a variety of television and film appearances to his credit, as an actor and a stand up, including Dr. Katz, Arrested Development, Everybody Loves Raymond, Late Show with David Letterman, Tom Goes to the Mayor, The Life and Times of Tim, The Daily Show, Late Night with Conan O'Brien, and Entourage.

From 1997 to 1999, Garlin spent three seasons on NBC's Mad About You in the role of Marvin. He co-starred and executive produced the HBO series Curb Your Enthusiasm. He had a recurring role on the series Wizards of Waverly Place as Uncle Kelbo, appearing in three episodes over the first three seasons.

Nine years after making an uncredited début as Gut Gut in Spring Break (1983), Garlin earned his first film credit in 1992, in Dolly Parton's comedy Straight Talk. He had a small role in RoboCop 3 as "Donut Jerk" after a member of the casting crew witnessed Garlin eating a doughnut while leaving Krispy Kreme with an additional two dozen doughnuts. He also had a cameo appearance in Austin Powers: The Spy Who Shagged Me in 1999.

Other cameo appearances include Run Ronnie Run!, After the Sunset, Fat Albert, and Sleepover. He appeared in Steven Soderbergh's Full Frontal (2002) and with Eddie Murphy in Daddy Day Care (2003). In 2005, he had a small role in Fun with Dick and Jane.

In 2008, Garlin appeared in The Rocker as Stan, and also played Ed Lawson in Strange Wilderness. He lent his voice to the Disney/Pixar films Toy Story 3 and Toy Story 4, as Buttercup. He appeared as Sid, alongside Jennifer Aniston and Gerard Butler, in the 2010 comedy action film The Bounty Hunter. He played Ed Burch in Laggies, released in 2014.

His feature directorial debut, I Want Someone to Eat Cheese With (which he also wrote), premiered to favorable reviews at the 2006 Tribeca Film Festival. It opened in September 2007. The film co-starred Sarah Silverman and Bonnie Hunt.

In 2006, Garlin directed This Filthy World, a one-man show performed by director John Waters. He was a voice actor in WALL-E, an animated film by Pixar that was released June 27, 2008, as B. McCrea, the Captain of the Axiom spaceship. Garlin executive produced the documentary Finding Vivian Maier (2013).

In 2013, Garlin signed onto the ABC sitcom The Goldbergs, which premiered September 24, 2013. He would play Murray Goldberg, the father of the title family. However, in December 2021, as shooting neared completion for the show's ninth season, Garlin exited the series, following misconduct allegations and investigations by the show's human resources department, initially reported in November 2019. For the remainder of the season, Garlin's character continued to appear on the show, portrayed via the use of outtakes, a stand-in, and CGI.

In July 2013, Garlin directed his second film, Dealin' with Idiots, which was inspired by his experiences with his two sons in Little League. The entire movie was improvised.

In October 2019, Garlin revealed he would have a role in Star Wars: The Rise of Skywalker, the final installment of the Star Wars saga, which was released on December 20, 2019. He played Junn Gobint.

Writing
On February 23, 2010, Garlin released a book, My Footprint: Carrying the Weight of the World, a memoir which documents his journey to lessen both his physical and carbon footprint.

Podcast
On the comedy podcast network Earwolf Garlin hosted a show, called By the Way, In Conversation with Jeff Garlin, which consisted of unscripted talks rather than formal interviews. The debut episode featured Garlin's Curb Your Enthusiasm co-star Larry David. The twice monthly installments were recorded in front of a live audience at Largo at the Coronet in Los Angeles. The last episode of the podcast was released in February 2015.

Other works
In March 2018, Garlin was one of the actors who voiced the audiobook A Day in the Life of Marlon Bundo.

In August 2020, Garlin was a guest DJ on SiriusXM's Tom Petty Radio.

Influences
Katie Puckrik in The Guardian writes, “British comedy is a touchstone for Garlin”, with Garlin stating, “Monty Python changed my life. I watched the original Office. I love The Mighty Boosh and The Goon Show. I'm a fanatic about Ealing comedies. And Fawlty Towers is probably my favorite thing that I've ever seen come out of England.”

Personal life

Garlin married Marla Beth Cahan on July 24, 1994. The couple have two sons, James (b. 1996) and Duke (b. 2000). In September 2018, the couple announced their intention to divorce after 24 years of marriage. In March 2020, Garlin stated that he and Cahan were at the end of their divorce proceedings.

Garlin is a fan of the Chicago Cubs. Every year on his birthday, he attends a game with his friend Kevin Cronin, lead singer of REO Speedwagon.

According to his book, Garlin voted for Barack Obama in the 2008 election.

Garlin practices transcendental meditation, which he does twice a day. He says it has helped him with symptoms of ADHD.

For a few years, Garlin lived with talk-show host Conan O'Brien. O'Brien has said that sometimes Garlin woke him up in the middle of the night and made him perform skits.

Garlin's dog on the television show The Goldbergs lives with him in real life.

Garlin announced on September 20, 2022, that he has been struggling with bipolar disorder, with the following caption "Bipolar is a motherfucker. Sometimes it’s just too much to deal with. I’m doing the best I can. This the first time that I’ve opened up about this."

Health
When he was in his late 20s, Garlin had surgery in Oklahoma City to correct a heart condition called Wolff–Parkinson–White syndrome, which is a defect in an accessory electrical conduction pathway in the heart that results in tachycardia. Garlin said he was an early recipient (#72) of the surgery, which millions of people have since undergone.

In February 2000, before filming began on Curb Your Enthusiasm, he had a stroke at the age of 37. During the early episodes of Season One, he had noticeably slurred speech that later improved. In addition to epilepsy and attention deficit disorder, he also has type II diabetes, which he controls with diet and exercise.
Garlin has written about his problems with food and has discussed his weight problems publicly. In an October 2011 interview, Garlin said: "I think people look at fat people as having a lack of willpower when willpower has nothing to do with it. I didn’t change my life until I approached everything like an addict. I haven’t had sweets in almost three years because I know if I have one cookie, just like if an alcoholic has his first drink, I’m off to the races and I’m back eating sugar again."

Filmography

Film

Television

Podcasts

Video games

Music videos

Awards and nominations

Works and publications
 Garlin, Jeff, and John Ficarra. The MAD Bathroom Companion: The Gushing Fourth Edition. New York: MAD Books, 2004.
 Garlin, Jeff. My Footprint: Carrying the Weight of the World. New York: Gallery Books, 2010; 
 Note: Republished as :
 Garlin, Jeff. Curbing It. New York: Gallery Books, 2010;

References

External links 

 
 

1962 births
20th-century American male actors
21st-century American male actors
20th-century American comedians
21st-century American comedians
American male film actors
American male television actors
American male video game actors
American male voice actors
American male writers
American podcasters
American stand-up comedians
Broward College alumni
Comedians from Florida
Comedians from Illinois
Film directors from Florida
Film directors from Illinois
Jewish American male actors
Jewish American male comedians
Jewish American comedians
Living people
Male actors from Chicago
Male actors from Florida
Nova High School alumni
People from Broward County, Florida
People from Morton Grove, Illinois
Television producers from Illinois
Upright Citizens Brigade Theater performers
University of Miami alumni
21st-century American Jews
Television producers from Florida
People with mood disorders